The 2021–22 season was the 12th in the history of Melbourne City Football Club In addition to the domestic league, Melbourne City will also competed in the FFA Cup and AFC Champions League. They were managed by Patrick Kisnorbo and captained by Scott Jamieson.

Players

First-team squad

Transfers

Transfers in

Transfers out

Contract extensions

Pre-season and friendlies

Competitions

Overview

A-League Men

League table

Results summary

Results by round

Matches

Notes:

Finals series

FFA Cup

AFC Champions League

Group stage

The draw for the group stage was held on 17 January 2022. Despite finishing the group stage undefeated with 3 wins and 3 draws; Melbourne City finished in second place due to goal difference, missing out on an automatic spot in the knockout stage of the tournament. They also didn't advance as one of the best runner-ups, due to Jeonbuk Hyundai Motors, Urawa Red Diamonds, and Kitchee performing better than them in their respective groups.

Statistics

Appearances and goals

Disciplinary record

Clean sheets

See also
 2021–22 in Australian soccer
 List of Melbourne City FC seasons

References

External links
 Melbourne City official website

Melbourne City FC seasons
2021–22 A-League Men season by team